Living in the City may refer to:

Living in the City (album), a 1996 album by Northern Lights
Livin' in the City, a 2005 album by the Fun Lovin' Criminals
Living in the City, a 1992 album by TJ Davis
"Living in the City", a 2007 song by Grinspoon from Alibis & Other Lies
"Living in the City", a 2005 song by Cuban Link from Man On Fire Mixtape
"Living in the City", a song by Hurray for the Riff Raff from The Navigator